Kitsübozou Ward is a ward located under Nagaland's capital city, Kohima. The ward falls under the designated Ward No. 5 of the Kohima Municipal Council.

Education
Educational Institutions in Kitsübozou Ward:

Schools 
 Kitsübozou Government Primary School
 Oking Christian School
 Tabitha Enabling Academy School

See also
 Municipal Wards of Kohima

References

External links
 Map of Kohima Ward No. 5

Kohima
Wards of Kohima